Vern Ival Paulsen (born 1951) is an American mathematician, focusing in operator theory, operator algebras, frame theory, C*-algebras, and quantum information theory.

Education and career
Paulsen studied mathematics at Western Michigan University, obtaining a BA in 1973. He then moved to University of Michigan and obtained his Ph.D. in mathematics under Carl Pearcy in 1977. He spent the following two years at University of Kansas as an instructor. Since 1979, he has been a faculty member in the Department of Mathematics at University of Houston. He was since 1996 the John and Rebecca Moores Professor at the University of Houston.

In 2015, Paulsen moved to Canada and became a professor in the department of pure mathematics at the Institute for Quantum Computing and at the University of Waterloo.

Bibliography

See also
 Ronald G. Douglas

References

Living people
University of Houston faculty
20th-century American mathematicians
Academic staff of the University of Waterloo
21st-century American mathematicians
Western Michigan University alumni
University of Michigan alumni
1951 births
Operator theorists